The coco chocolatero was a cup used to serve small quantities of beverages (such as chocolate drinks) between the 17th century and the 19th century in countries like Mexico, Guatemala and Venezuela. It was made of coconut shell, hence its name.

Elaboration 
During the Viceroyalty of New Spain, the elaboration of this object was possible thanks to the adaptation of the natural coconut palms from the Pacific islands in other territories. The hard shells of the coconuts were cleaned and cut to be polished. Then, the shells were carved with a burin, decorated with lavish geometric figures, and mounted in complex polished silver works.

The process of elaboration was carried out in two phases. First, the coconut was curved and decorated with metal, shell and semiprecious stone applications. Later, the object was mounted in silver, forming a pedestal where the name of the owner, the year, and the place of the manufacturer was written. These objects were manufactured in the Americas and different places of Europe, including Germany, Spain and France.

The popularization of the coco chocolatero recipient is related to the transformation of the cocoa consumption during the colonial period, mostly associated to the use of sugar as a sweetener. The maize dough (or masa) of the beverage was also substituted by milk, a variation much closer to the current chocolate drink. This change boosted the use of the coco chocolatero as a luxury item.

See also
Coconut cup
Coconut shell cup

References

Chocolate drinks
Chocolate
History of Mexico
New Spain
Coconuts
Drinkware
Silver objects